Debo Adeyewa is a Nigerian academic, administrator and author. He was the former Vice chancellor of the Redeemer's University Nigeria. He succeeded in moving the University to its permanent location.

References

Vice-Chancellors of Nigerian universities
Year of birth missing (living people)
Living people
Academic staff of Redeemer's University Nigeria